Rowsburg is an unincorporated community in Ashland County, in the U.S. state of Ohio.

History
Rowsburg was laid out and platted in 1835 by Michael D. Row, and named for him. A former variant name of Rowsburg was Rows. A post office called Rows was established in 1840, and remained in operation until 1905.

Notable person
Rufus Cole, a medical researcher and first director of the Rockefeller University Hospital, was born in Rowsburg in 1872.

References

Unincorporated communities in Ashland County, Ohio
1835 establishments in Ohio
Populated places established in 1835
Unincorporated communities in Ohio